

The Tupolev ANT-22 (also known as the MK-1) was a large flying boat built in the Soviet Union in 1934. A huge aircraft consisting of two hulls and powered by six engines in three nacelles in a push-pull configuration, it was based on the ANT-11, which was never built. Its enormous weight severely crippled its performance, and it never proceeded beyond the experimental stage.

Operators
 
 Soviet Naval Aviation

Specifications (ANT-22)

Notes

References

 

1930s Soviet patrol aircraft
Flying boats
ANT-22
Six-engined push-pull aircraft
Twin-fuselage aircraft
Aircraft first flown in 1934